A watering hole or waterhole is a geological depression in which a body of water forms, usually a pond or a small lake, where animals tend to gather to obtain water. 

A watering hole is "a sunken area of land that fills with water". Watering holes can form through a number of processes, one being from elephants digging up termite mounds for nutrients in the soil, repeatedly digging at the same location until a depression large enough to hold a substantial amount of water. Watering holes may be ephemeral or seasonal.

A common misconception associated with watering holes is that, due to the common need for water, predator animals will not attack prey animals in the vicinity of the watering hole. This trope was exploited, for example, by Rudyard Kipling in The Jungle Book, which describes a "truce" at the watering hole as a plot point. In fact, it has been observed that "lions usually ambush their prey by hiding in long grass, often in close proximity to a watering hole".

One study noted that watering holes can serve as a locus of disease transmission, and observed that "all animals displayed some degree of increased watering hole use with at least one metric of decreased water availability, suggesting that drying environments may contribute to increased parasite concentration at these hotspots across species".

References

External links

Depressions (geology)